Ludvig Byström (born 20 July 1994) is a Swedish professional ice hockey defenceman for Oulun Kärpät of the Finnish Liiga. He was drafted 43rd overall by the Dallas Stars in the 2012 NHL Entry Draft.

Playing career
Prior to being drafted, Byström played with Modo Hockey in the Elitserien during the 2010–11 and 2011–12 seasons.

During the 2012 NHL Entry Draft, Byström was drafted in the second round, 43rd overall by the Dallas Stars. On 16 July 2012, he signed a three-year entry-level contract with the Stars. However, he was then returned on loan to Modo. On 29 April 2013, Byström was reassigned from Modo to league rivals Färjestad BK for two seasons on loan.

At the completion of the 2014–15 season with Färjestad BK, Byström embarked on his North American career in reporting to the Stars' American Hockey League (AHL) affiliate in Texas on 12 March 2015.

On 17 June 2017, the Stars re-signed Byström to a one-year, two-way extension worth $650,000. On 10 November 2017 Byström was traded to the Florida Panthers in exchange for Reece Scarlett. He was immediately assigned to Panthers' AHL affiliate, the Springfield Thunderbirds. On 31 May 2018, he signed a one-year contract extension with the Panthers.

Following the 2018–19 season, his fifth season in North America, unable to break into the NHL, Byström as an impending restricted free agent from the Panthers opted to return to Europe, securing a two-year contract with Finnish club, Oulun Kärpät, on 16 May 2019.

Career statistics

Regular season and playoffs

International

References

External links
 

1994 births
Living people
Dallas Stars draft picks
Färjestad BK players
Modo Hockey players
Örebro HK players
Oulun Kärpät players
People from Örnsköldsvik Municipality
Springfield Thunderbirds players
Swedish ice hockey defencemen
Texas Stars players
Timrå IK players
Sportspeople from Västernorrland County